Major General (Vermont) Thomas E. Drew (born August 8, 1950) was the adjutant general of the State of Vermont.  In this post he served as the senior uniformed military officer in the state, and was responsible for the organization, training and equipping of the 4,000 members of the Vermont Army and Air National Guard.  As adjutant general, he also served as inspector general, quartermaster general and head of the State Military Department, including veterans affairs.

Biography
Thomas Edwin Drew was born in Proctor, Vermont, on August 8, 1950.  He was raised in Florence, attended school in Florence, Pittsford and Brandon and graduated from the University of Vermont in 1972.

Military career
Drew received his commission as a second lieutenant in the United States Army through UVM's Reserve Officers' Training Corps.  After serving on active duty with the 9th Infantry Division until 1977, he joined the Vermont National Guard and became a member of the Active Guard and Reserve Program.  He retired as a colonel in 2001.  Drew's service included command of: Company A, 2nd Battalion, 172nd Armor (1983 to 1985); 1st Battalion, 172nd Armor (1992 to 1995); and the 86th Armored Brigade (1997 to 2000).

Civilian career
Upon retirement, General Drew served as the executive director of the Addison County branch of the Retired Senior Volunteer Program (RSVP), a non-profit community service provider in Castleton.

Subsequent military career
In 2006, Drew returned to military service as deputy adjutant general with a state commission as a brigadier general.

Drew served as deputy adjutant general until 2009, when he was voluntarily recalled to active duty as a colonel. He deployed to Afghanistan for Operation Enduring Freedom as deputy commander of the 86th Infantry Brigade Combat Team (Mountain).  During the deployment Drew reached age 60, the mandatory age for retirement from the military, but remained in Afghanistan and continued to serve.

Upon redeploying from Afghanistan Drew returned to the military's Retired Reserve and resumed his state duties as deputy adjutant general.

In 2012 Michael Dubie was appointed as deputy commander of United States Northern Command.  Upon Dubie's August 3, 2012, resignation as Vermont's adjutant general to assume his new duties, Drew succeeded him as adjutant general.  Drew was subsequently promoted to major general (Vermont), and served out the remainder of Dubie's term.

On February 21, 2013, the Vermont General Assembly elected Steven A. Cray to serve as adjutant general.  (In Vermont, the adjutant general is elected for a two-year term in secret balloting by a combined meeting of the Vermont House of Representatives and Vermont State Senate in February of each odd-numbered year.)

Cray took over from Drew in a ceremony on March 1, 2013, and Drew retired.

Education
 University of Vermont, Bachelor of Science in History, 1972, Burlington, Vermont
 U.S. Army Intelligence Center and School, Intelligence Officer Basic Course, 1973, Fort Huachuca, Arizona
 United States Army Armor School, Armor Officer Advanced Course, 1984, Fort Knox, Kentucky
 United States Army Command and General Staff College, Command and General Staff Officer Course, 1988, Fort Leavenworth, Kansas

Awards and decorations

Effective Dates of Promotions

Other achievements
 Order of St. George Bronze Medallion, U.S. Cavalry & Armor Association, 1995
 Order of St. George Silver Medallion, 2000

References

1950 births
Living people
People from Proctor, Vermont
United States Army generals
National Guard (United States) generals
United States Army personnel of the War in Afghanistan (2001–2021)
University of Vermont alumni
United States Army Command and General Staff College alumni
Recipients of the Legion of Merit
Vermont National Guard personnel